The Acer Liquid Z630 is a touchscreen smartphone developed and marketed by Acer Inc. It was announced in the September 2015 IFA exhibition in Berlin.

Features
The Acer Liquid Z630 mt6735 (64bit) smartphone is powered by Android 11. It also enjoys an overlay software developed by Acer itself. When first firing, it needs to be configured in particular as regards security. For example, it is possible to protect the mobile preventing others from using the device without permission with the insertion of a pattern, a PIN or password.

With Acer Identifier, it is possible to obtain some services such as receiving updates, retrieve the applications already installed on other devices and access to customer service.

In standby, the smartphone is able to recognize simple gestures. Drawing a 'C' allows direct access to the Camera application, drawing a 'V' starts the application phone while 'Z' starts the music player.

References

External links

Liquid Z630
Android (operating system) devices
Mobile phones introduced in 2015